Puerto Rico Highway 41 (PR-41) is an urban road in Hato Rey, Puerto Rico. This is a short road that connects from the PR-25 (Avenida Juan Ponce de León) to PR-17 (Avenida Jesús T. Piñero). This road runs along the Calle Eleanor Roosevelt and the southern part of Calle César L. González.

Major intersections

See also

 List of highways numbered 41

References

External links
 

041
Roads in San Juan, Puerto Rico